Elections to Erewash Borough Council were held on 6 May 1976 as part of nationwide local elections. The election saw the Conservative Party gain control of the Council for the first time.

Overall results

Erewash Borough Council - Results by Ward

Breadsall and Morley

Breaston

Dale Abbey

Draycott

Ilkeston Granby

Ilkeston Market

Ilkeston North

Ilkeston South

Ilkeston Victoria

Little Eaton

Long Eaton Derby Road

Long Eaton New Sawley

Long Eaton Nottingham Road and Sawley Road

Ockbrook and Borrowash

Old Park

Sandiacre

Stanley

West Hallam

References

1976
1976 English local elections
1970s in Derbyshire